Benjamin Winchester (August 6, 1817 – January 25, 1901) was an early leader in the Latter Day Saint movement.  Winchester was the youngest adult member of Zion's Camp, an original member of the first Quorum of the Seventy, editor of the first independent Mormon periodical, the Gospel Reflector, president of a large branch of the church in Philadelphia, a zealous missionary who baptized thousands, a Rigdonite Apostle, and ultimately a dissenter who repudiated Mormonism altogether.

The Gospel Reflector was published in Philadelphia, twice a month, between January 1, 1841, and June 15, 1841. Winchester moved to Nauvoo, Illinois, in October 1841 where he worked at the Times and Seasons until January 1842.

Winchester also wrote pamphlets and two significant books on Latter Day Saint topics. His Synopsis of the Holy Scriptures, and Concordance, published in 1842, was the first categorization of Bible scriptures from a Mormon perspective and included a detailed analysis of the Christian apostasy. His A Brief History of the Priesthood from the Beginning of the World to the Present Time, published in 1843, was the first book to focus on the topic of the Mormon priesthood.

References

Benjamin Winchester (ed.), The Gospel Reflector, reprint of the original 1841 Philadelphia edition by Richard Drew for the Church of Jesus Christ of Latter Day Saints (Strangite), 1993.
Elizabeth Proctor Kiddle et alia (ed.), The Family of Auer Winchester Proctor, Provo, Utah: 1978.
David J. Whittaker, Early Mormon Pamphleteering, BYU Studies, 2003.
The Gospel Reflector (PDF scans), L. Tom Perry Special Collections, Harold B. Lee Library, Brigham Young University.

1817 births
1901 deaths
19th-century Mormon missionaries
American Latter Day Saint leaders
American Latter Day Saints
American Mormon missionaries in the United States
Converts to Mormonism
Editors of Latter Day Saint publications
Former Latter Day Saints
Latter Day Saint leaders
Leaders in the Church of Christ (Latter Day Saints)
Members of the First Quorum of the Seventy (LDS Church)
Rigdonites